Vilchura is a genus of spiders in the family Euagridae. It was first described in 2017 by Ríos-Tamayo & Goloboff. , it contains only one species, Vilchura calderoni, from Chile.

References

Euagridae
Monotypic Mygalomorphae genera
Endemic fauna of Chile